Eriphus bisignatus is a species of beetle in the family Cerambycidae. It was first described by Ernst Friedrich Germar in 1824.

References

Eriphus
Beetles described in 1824